Millwood Township is one of the nineteen townships of Guernsey County, Ohio, United States. As of the 2010 census the population was 1,419, of whom 917 lived in the unincorporated portion of the township.

Geography
Located in the southeastern corner of the county, it borders the following townships:
Oxford Township - north
Warren Township, Belmont County - east
Somerset Township, Belmont County - southeast
Beaver Township, Noble County - south
Wayne Township, Noble County - southwest
Richland Township - west
Wills Township - northwest

One incorporated village is located in Millwood Township: Quaker City, near the township center. Salesville, in the western part of the township, is a former village which disincorporated in 2015. Leatherwood Creek flows through the township.

Name and history
Millwood Township was established around 1834. It is the only Millwood Township statewide.

Government
The township is governed by a three-member board of trustees, who are elected in November of odd-numbered years to a four-year term beginning on the following January 1. Two are elected in the year after the presidential election and one is elected in the year before it. There is also an elected township fiscal officer, who serves a four-year term beginning on April 1 of the year after the election, which is held in November of the year before the presidential election. Vacancies in the fiscal officership or on the board of trustees are filled by the remaining trustees.

References

External links
County website

Townships in Guernsey County, Ohio
Townships in Ohio